McCaffrey Gilmete (born 3 August 1990) is a sprinter representing the Federated States of Micronesia. He competed in the 100 metres event at the 2013 World Championships in Athletics.

References

1990 births
Living people
Federated States of Micronesia male sprinters
Place of birth missing (living people)
World Athletics Championships athletes for the Federated States of Micronesia